Dirk Heesen (born 15 September 1969) is a Dutch professional football coach and former player who is currently assistant manager of Eredivisie side ADO Den Haag.

Playing career
Heesen played for Utrecht, Wageningen, ADO Den Haag and FC Oss in a career that spanned from 1988 to 2002.

Coaching career
After retiring in 2002, Heesen began coaching at FC Oss, and continued in an assisting role until 2010, when he was appointed their manager. Heesen remained as Oss' manager until 2012, winning them promotion from the Topklasse Sunday League in the process. In 2012, he was head coach of Team VVCS. Heesen then worked as assistant of Willem II from 2013 to 2015. He worked in China in 2015 with Guangzhou Evergrande as a coach before moving on 15 December 2015 to Queens Park Rangers as the first team coach. Heesen left that role in November 2016, and rejoined ADO Den Haag where he played in the '90s, as an assistant coach in February 2017.

References

1969 births
Living people
Footballers from Utrecht (city)
Dutch footballers
Dutch football managers
Association football defenders
TOP Oss players
FC Utrecht players
FC Wageningen players
ADO Den Haag players
Queens Park Rangers F.C. non-playing staff
TOP Oss managers
ADO Den Haag managers
Eredivisie managers
Eerste Divisie managers
Willem II (football club) non-playing staff